Bryce Edgmon (born May 3, 1961) is a member of the Alaska House of Representatives, representing the 37th District since 2006. He served as speaker from 2017–2021. The district includes all or portions of the Kodiak Island Borough, Aleutians East Borough, Lake and Peninsula Borough, Bristol Bay Borough, and the Yukon–Koyukuk Census Area.

Early and personal life
Edgmon was born and raised in Dillingham, Alaska, where he fished commercially for salmon and herring for more than twenty years and where he was a longtime chairman of the board of Choggiung Ltd., the Alaska Native village corporation for the communities of Dillingham, Ekuk, and Portage Creek. Edgmon's birth certificate identified him as three-sixteenths Aleut, and Edgmon was raised in a household that spoke Yup'ik. Edgmon is married to Melody Nibeck, and they have three children: Evan, Emma, and Magy. He currently lives in Dillingham. He received his Bachelor of Business Administration from the University of Alaska, Anchorage.

Legislative career
Bryce Edgmon challenged incumbent Carl Moses in the 2006 Democratic primary. The election deadlocked in a tie with each candidate receiving 767 votes. Eventually, the tie was settled by a coin toss.

After his party won 17 seats in 2016, 2 Independents and 3 moderate Republicans decided to caucus with the Democrats, elevating him to Speaker. He is the first Alaskan Native in the history of the state to hold the position.

In addition to his duties as Speaker, Edgmon is serves as vice-chair of the Health & Social Services Committee and chair of the Committee on Committees. He is also a member of the Commerce, Community & Economic Development; Legislative Council; and Arctic Policy and Economic Development & Tourism Committees for the 30th Legislature.

Prior to the 30th Alaska Legislature, Edgmon was seated on the House Finance Committee, with chairmanships of the Department of Public Safety and Department of Corrections Budget Subcommittees. During the 26th Legislature (2009–2010), Edgmon was co-chair of the House Energy Committee and chairman of the House Special Committee on Fisheries. Additionally, he has served on the Resources and Education Standing Committees and the ADF&G, Revenue, Commerce, and Transportation Budget Subcommittees.

See also
 List of Native American politicians
 List of state legislature Speakers

References

External links
 Alaska State House Majority Site
 Alaska State Legislature Biography
 Project Vote Smart profile
 Follow the Money – Bryce Edgmon
 2006 1994 campaign contributions
 Bryce Edgmon at 100 Years of Alaska's Legislature

|-

1961 births
Living people
21st-century American politicians
Alaska Independents
Alaska Native people
Native American state legislators in Alaska
People from Dillingham Census Area, Alaska
Speakers of the Alaska House of Representatives
Democratic Party members of the Alaska House of Representatives
University of Alaska Anchorage alumni
Yupik people
American people of Aleut descent